Shaqir Veseli (born 1957) is an Albanian painter and animation filmmaker from Krujë, Albania. Some of his paintings are part of the selected collection of the National Art Gallery of Albania.

Filmography 
 1998 production designer for the film Kolonel Bunker from the director Kujtim Çashku.
 2001 set decorator for the film Slogans - Parrullat from director Gjergj Xhuvan which was one of the winner films at the Tokyo Film Festival.
 Is the author of the animated film Coffee Bar - Kafeneja, Tsunami and Guernika.

See also 
 Modern Albanian art
 List of Albanian painters

References

Sources
Bksh.al
Talk - Shaqir Veseli, Anibar Film Festival "...Shaqir Veseli, [on] difficulties and challenges that are present in Albania, when creating animations."Anibar International Animation Festival, Albania, 14 August 2013. Retrieved on 18 December 2013.
Shaqir Veseli discuss about problems with Film Animation by Julia Vrapi, "N CC doesn't finances the projects, animated film is going to extinction-QKK nuk financon projektet, filmi i animuar drejt shuarjes" sot.com.a, Albania, Wednesday, 14 August 2013. Retrieved on 18 December 2013.

External links 
 
Article for painting exhibition
Channel One presentation
Cinematographers Profile
British Festival

Date of birth missing (living people)
1957 births
20th-century Albanian painters
21st-century Albanian painters
Albanian film directors
Living people
People from Krujë